Banghwa station is a subway station on Line 5 of the Seoul Metropolitan Subway. Located in Gangseo-gu, Seoul, it is the Western terminus of Line 5.

Station layout

Vicinity
Public Centers:
 Banghwa 1-dong Citizen's Center
 Banghwa 3-dong Citizen's Center
 Banghwa Welfare Center
 Banghwa Police Station
 Banghwa Fire Station
 Banghwa Post Office
 Korean Language Center
 Bangsin Market
 Neuti Park
Schools:
 Chihyeon Elementary School
 Samjeong Elementary School
 Samjeong Middle School
 Bangwon Middle School
 Hanseo High School
 Gangseo Industrial High School

References

Railway stations opened in 1996
Seoul Metropolitan Subway stations
Metro stations in Gangseo District, Seoul